The Los Angeles Stars were a minor league basketball team in the American Basketball Association (ABA) during the league's inaugural 2000–01 season.  The Stars were one of the league's initial eight teams.  The Stars were defunct after its initial season.

To attract fans, the ABA had rosters with former National Basketball Association (NBA) players and past college basketball stars with local ties. The Stars used their territorial draft picks to select Ed O'Bannon and Tyus Edney, who won the 1995 NCAA championship together at UCLA. O'Bannon, a former first-round draft pick in the 1995 NBA Draft, played for the Stars, while Edney played for the Indiana Pacers in the NBA that season. O'Bannon was joined on the team by former UCLA players Toby Bailey, who also played with O'Bannon on the 1995 championship team, and JaRon Rush.

The Stars' head coach was former Los Angeles Lakers and Loyola Marymount head coach Paul Westhead, while former UC Irvine star Scott Brooks was an assistant coach as well as a player on the Stars. Former Lakers star Jamaal Wilkes was hired as vice president of basketball operations. His former college coach at UCLA, the legendary John Wooden, agreed to join the Stars as a consultant at Wilkes' request.

The team's record was 28–13 in 2000–2001, and their season ended with a 112–132 first-round playoff loss to the Kansas City Knights.

Roster

References

External links

Defunct American Basketball Association (2000–present) teams
Stars
Basketball teams established in 2000
Stars
2000 establishments in California
2001 disestablishments in California
Sports clubs disestablished in 2001